The Women's  Freestyle Relay at the 2006 Central American and Caribbean Games occurred on Monday, July 17, 2006, at the S.U. Pedro de Heredia Aquatic Complex in Cartagena, Colombia.

Only 6 relays were entered in the event, and consequently, it was only swum once (in finals).

Records at the time of the event were:
World Record: 7:53.42,  USA (Coughlin, Voller, Piper, Sandeno), Athens, Greece, August 18, 2004.
Games Record: 8:39.83,  Cuba (names not listed/unknown), 1993 Games in Ponce (Nov.20.1993).

Results

References

2006 CAC results: Women's 4x200 Free Relay from the website of the 2006 Central American and Caribbean Games; retrieved 2009-07-12.

Freestyle Relay, Women's 4x200m
2006 in women's swimming